Zonta International is an international service organization with the mission of advancing the status of women.

History
The first Zonta Club was founded in Buffalo, New York, the United States, in 1919 by a group of businesswomen under the leadership of Marian de Forest. It was organized along the lines of the Rotary Club, with one woman from each business classification admitted to the local club and all members required to give 60% of their time to the "work under which they are classified". By 1923 clubs had been established in New York City, Washington, D.C., Detroit, Cleveland, and Toledo, Ohio. The National President was Miss Harriet A. Ackroyd of Utica, New York.

The Confederation of Zonta Clubs was formed in 1930. Originally conceived as a female equivalent of the Lions Clubs (an organization that, until 1987, was all-male), Zonta sponsors programs to help women in the field of public affairs and policymaking. It has consultative status with the Council of Europe, the United Nations (UN), ILO, and several UN agencies.

Currently, Zonta International is headquartered in Oak Brook, Illinois. The organization has more than 31,000 members in 65 countries.

The organization's name derives from the Lakota zónta meaning "honest" or "trustworthy".

References

External links
Zonta International Web Page
 A Guide to the Zonta Club of San Antonio Records, University of Texas at San Antonio Libraries (UTSA Libraries) Special Collections.
Archived records of the Zonta Club of the Northampton Area at Smith College.

Organizations established in 1919
Women's organizations based in the United States
Women's clubs in the United States
Organizations for women in business
Service organizations based in the United States
International women's organizations
1919 establishments in New York (state)